Mildenhall Town Football Club is a football club based in Mildenhall, Suffolk.

History
The club was established in August 1898. They won the Suffolk Junior Cup in 1900, beating Southwold RA Volunteers 4–0 in the final. In 1945 the club joined the Bury & District League, where they played until switching to the Cambridgeshire League in 1969. In 1974–75 they were promoted to the league's Premier Division.

In 1988 Mildenhall joined the Eastern Counties League as founder members of the new Division One. The club won the Cambridgeshire Invitation Cup in 1995–96, beating Foxton 3–0 in the final. They were Division One runners-up in 1998–99, earning promotion to the Premier Division. In 2006–07 the club were runners-up in the Premier Division. They won the Cambridgeshire Invitation Cup for a second time in 2009–10, beating Wisbech Town in the final, and went on to retain the trophy the following season with a 2–0 win against Haverhill Rovers.

The 2016–17 season saw Mildenhall win the Eastern Counties League Premier Division title, resulting in promotion to Division One North of the Isthmian League. They finished bottom of the division in 2018–19 and were relegated back to the Premier Division of the Eastern Counties League.

Ground
After playing at several grounds, the club moved to its current ground on Recreation Way following World War II, initially sharing with the cricket club. The site had been gifted to the town by the Bunhill family during the war. In 1970 the cricket club left and the football pitch was rotated 90º. Following promotion to the Eastern Counties League, a 250-capacity standing covered area was erected in 1989 and a clubhouse was built in 1991. Floodlights were installed in 1994. Another 50-seat stand was installed in 2017.

Honours
Eastern Counties League
Premier Division champions 2016–17
League Cup winners 2015–16, 2016–17
Cambridgeshire Invitation Cup
Winners 1995–96, 2009–10, 2010–11
Suffolk Junior Cup
Winners 1899–1900

Records
Best FA Cup performance: Third qualifying round, 2000–01
Best FA Trophy performance: Third qualifying round, 2017–18
Best FA Vase performance: Fifth round, 2005–06, 2006–07
Record attendance: 450 vs Derby County, friendly match, July 2001

See also
Mildenhall Town F.C. players
Mildenhall Town F.C. managers

References

External links
Official website

 
Football clubs in England
Football clubs in Suffolk
Association football clubs established in 1898
1898 establishments in England
Mildenhall, Suffolk
St. Edmundsbury Football League
Cambridgeshire County Football League
Eastern Counties Football League
Isthmian League